The Parel van de Veluwe was an amateur road bicycle race held in the Netherlands for men and women, that was held between 1985 and 2019. After not being held in 2020, race organisers Wielervereniging De IJsselstreek announced that December that they would no longer organise the race.

Honours

Women's 

SourceList of winners women Stichting WV De IJsselstreek.nl/parelvandeveluwe. Retrieved 9 June 2018.

Men's 

Source

References

External links 
 

Women's road bicycle races
Recurring sporting events established in 1985
1985 establishments in the Netherlands
Men's road bicycle races
Recurring sporting events disestablished in 2020
2020 disestablishments in the Netherlands